John Evans House, also known as Raub Hall at the University of Delaware, is a historic home located at Newark in New Castle County, Delaware.  The first section was built about 1800.  The house in its present form is a two-story, gable roofed brick structure measuring six bays across.  The original structure was expanded during the 19th and early 20th centuries to its present size.  After 1888, it was converted to commercial use.  In 1947, it was purchased by the University of Delaware and renovated in the 1960s for office space.

It was added to the National Register of Historic Places in 1983.

References

Houses on the National Register of Historic Places in Delaware
Houses completed in 1800
University of Delaware
Houses in Newark, Delaware
National Register of Historic Places in New Castle County, Delaware